Through the Eyes of the Dead is an American deathcore band from Florence, South Carolina, formed in 2003. They have released four full-length albums, one EP, and one split album with The Knife Trade.

History
The band was formed by Justin Longshore in 2003 after the break-up of a previous group, Tellherisaidgoodbye Their first full-length album was released in 2005 through Prosthetic Records. Shortly before, every member except for Longshore and Gunnells left, with Gunnells also being let go a few months later due to personal reasons. They then added new members which would be known as the 'malice' lineup however, they would also part ways with the band before the 3rd studio album would be released, leaving behind Jake Ososkie (bass) and Justin Longshore (guitar) remaining. After taking some offtime they regrouped yet again and released their 3rd album 'Skepsis'. The band believes their current lineup is the strongest and that Skepsis represents a mix of everything the band has done and more. The band's influences include Morbid Angel, Blood Has Been Shed, Suffocation, Cannibal Corpse (as suggested by the band's name, possibly taken from the Cannibal Corpse song "Staring Through the Eyes of the Dead"), Meshuggah, Behemoth, and At the Gates.

The band has released three records with Prosthetic Records: Bloodlust in 2005, Malice in 2007, and Skepsis in 2010.

Shortly before the US release of Malice, the band shot a music video with acclaimed director David Brodsky at the abandoned mental facility in Kings Park, Long Island, NY. The video went on to be one of the most played videos on MTV2's Headbanger's Ball in 2007 and was chosen as the #7 Video of the Year 2007. It was in the Top 10 Music Choice VOD for nearly 6 months as of April 2008.

TTEOTD has been touring extensively supporting the release of Skepsis with many national acts including Suffocation, The Faceless, Decrepit Birth, Fleshgod Apocalypse, Otep, Bury Your Dead, Chelsea Grin, The Tony Danza Tapdance Extravaganza, Impending Doom, Whitechapel, Born of Osiris, Periphery, and Greeley Estates to name a few. The band performed on half of 2010's 'thrash n burn' tour as well. On April 30, 2012 the band announced through their Facebook that Pre-Production has begun on a new album.

The band had posted some samples of their EP on Instagram. In March 2017, the band announced that they would be recording a new full-length album instead to be released through Good Fight Entertainment. A pre-production version of a new song, Phantoms (now titled "Of Mortals, We Once Were" on the album Disomus), could be heard on the band's SoundCloud page and on YouTube.

In August 2017, the band announced that their new album, Disomus, would be released on October 13th, 2017. It was released through the label partnership eOne Music/Good Fight Music with 10 tracks and received generally positive reviews.

Members

Current
 Justin Longshore – guitar (2003–present)
 Jake Ososkie – bass (2005–present)
 Danny Rodriguez – vocals (2008–present)
 Michael Ranne – drums (2009–present; touring 2008)
 Steven Funderburk – guitar (2016–present)

Former
 Jeff Springs – bass (2003–2005)
 Dayton Cantley – drums (2003–2005)
 Anthony Gunnells – vocals (2003–2007)
 Richard Turbeville – guitar (2003–2004, 2007–2008)
 Chris Anderson – guitar (2004–2007)
 Josh Kulick – drums (2005–2008)
 Nate Johnson – vocals (2007)
 Chris Henckel – guitar (2008–2016)

Touring
 Jerry Stovall – drums (2005)
 Lou Tanuis – vocals (2007)
 Hector De Santiago – drums (2007)
 Steven Funderburk – guitar (2014)

Timeline

Discography
Studio albums
 Bloodlust (2005)
 Malice (2007)
 Skepsis  (2010)
 Disomus (2017)

EPs
 The Scars of Ages (2004)

Splits
 Annihilation of Expectation (2005; split with The Knife Trade)

Music videos
"Two Inches from a Main Artery" (2006)
"Failure in the Flesh" (2007)
"Hate The Living" (2017)

External links
 Official Website

References

Musical groups established in 2003
Heavy metal musical groups from South Carolina
American deathcore musical groups
American death metal musical groups
MNRK Music Group artists
Musical quartets